Li Tiantian (李甜甜) is a Chinese sprint canoer who has competed since the late 2000s. She won the silver medal in the C-1 200 m event at the 2010 ICF Canoe Sprint World Championships in Poznań.

References 
2010 ICF Canoe Sprint World Championships results from tsn.ca. - Retrieved 23 August 2010 (misspelled as Li Tianian).

Chinese female canoeists
Living people
Year of birth missing (living people)
ICF Canoe Sprint World Championships medalists in Canadian